Built Like That may refer to:

 Built Like That (song), a song by Scott Storch
 Built Like That (album), a spoken word album by Alix Olson